Hayley Gloria Palmer (born 8 May 1989 in Cheltenham) is an Olympian and National Record holding swimmer from New Zealand. She swam for NZ at the 2008 Beijing Olympic Games and 2012 Summer Olympics.

Early life
Palmer was born in Cheltenham, England. However, both her parents are New Zealand nationals and they returned to New Zealand for two years when Palmer was young, before moving back to Cheltenham when she was 3. In Cheltenham, Palmer attended St Edwards School, and grammar school at the High School for Girls, where she currently holds every school record in swimming. Palmer began swimming in England, before her return to New Zealand in 2007.

Her international debut for New Zealand was at the 2008 Short Course Worlds in Manchester in April 2008.

Her coach for the majority of her swimming career in England was Graham Brookhouse. During her early teenage years she was a member of the Gloucester City Swimming Club. She currently swims for North Shore Swimming in Auckland, and is coached by Randy Reese at Clearwater Aquatics in Florida.

Palmer is a Latter-day Saint.

She competed for New Zealand at the 2008 Summer Olympics in the women's 4 × 200 m freestyle relay.

In the 2009 13th Fina World Swimming Championships she made the semi-finals of the 100m freestyle and placed 11th.

At the 2010 Commonwealth Games in Delhi, Palmer won 2 bronze medals, in the 50m freestyle and 4 × 100 m freestyle relay.

At the 2012 Olympics, she competed in the 50 m freestyle and the  freestyle.

Swimming records
Palmer currently holds the following New Zealand Records:
Women's Long Course 50m Freestyle (25.01)
Women's Long Course 100m Freestyle (53.91)
Women's Short Course 50m Freestyle (24.39)
Women's Short Course 100m Freestyle (53.57)

References

1989 births
Living people
English emigrants to New Zealand
New Zealand female swimmers
Swimmers at the 2008 Summer Olympics
Swimmers at the 2012 Summer Olympics
Olympic swimmers of New Zealand
Swimmers at the 2010 Commonwealth Games
Commonwealth Games bronze medallists for New Zealand
Sportspeople from Cheltenham
New Zealand Latter Day Saints
People educated at the High School for Girls
Commonwealth Games medallists in swimming
Swimmers from Auckland
Medallists at the 2010 Commonwealth Games